Charlton Nyirenda (born 29 August 1988) is a competitive swimmer from Malawi. He competed in the 2008 Summer Olympics in Beijing, China, and was the flag-bearer for his nation during the opening ceremonies of those games.

References
sports-reference

1988 births
Living people
Malawian male swimmers
Swimmers at the 2008 Summer Olympics
Olympic swimmers of Malawi
Swimmers at the 2010 Commonwealth Games
Commonwealth Games competitors for Malawi